Frost is an unincorporated community in eastern Pocahontas County, West Virginia, United States. Frost is also home to Mountain Quest Institute.

The highly elevated townsite experiences frequent frost conditions, hence the name.

Climate
The climate in this area has mild differences between highs and lows, and there is adequate rainfall year-round.  According to the Köppen Climate Classification system, Frost has a marine west coast climate, abbreviated "Cfb" on climate maps.

References

Unincorporated communities in Pocahontas County, West Virginia
Unincorporated communities in West Virginia